The Dominican Republic women's national baseball team is a national team of Dominican Republic and is controlled by the Federación Dominicana de Béisbol. It represents the nation in women's international competition. The team is a member of the COPABE. They are currently Not ranked. Their General Manager is Tracey Cuesta.

References 

Women's national baseball teams
Women's national sports teams of the Dominican Republic